Uyanık is a Turkish surname. Notable people with the surname include:

 Ertan Uyanık (born 1979), Turkish futsal player
 Özgür Uyanık, Turkish writer and film director

See also
 Uyanık, Bismil
 Uyanık, Hınıs
 Uyanık, Sarayköy

Turkish-language surnames